The Cypress Waters station is a future train station along the Dallas Area Rapid Transit Silver Line. The station will be located at 445 E Belt Line Road in Dallas, Texas. The station will serve the newly planned Cypress Waters community to the south. The station was previously expected to open in 2024, but has been delayed with the Silver Line until late 2025 to mid-2026.

References

Dallas Area Rapid Transit commuter rail stations
Coppell, Texas
Proposed public transportation in Texas
Proposed railway stations in the United States
Railway stations scheduled to open in 2024